The 2009 Roma Open was a professional tennis tournament played on outdoor red clay courts. It was part of the 2009 ATP Challenger Tour. It took place in Rome, Italy between 20 and 26 April 2009.

Singles entrants

Seeds

 Rankings are as of April 12, 2010.

Other entrants
The following players received wildcards into the singles main draw:
  Daniele Bracciali
  Alessio di Mauro
  Jerzy Janowicz
  Gianluca Naso

The following players received entry from the qualifying draw:
  Francesco Aldi
  Javier Genaro-Martínez
  Tim Goransson

The following players received lucky loser into the singles main draw:
  Attila Balázs
  Robert Smeets
  Federico Torresi

Champions

Men's singles

 Daniel Köllerer def.  Andreas Vinciguerra, 6–3, 6–3.

Men's doubles

 Simon Greul /  Christopher Kas def.  Johan Brunström /  Jean-Julien Rojer, 4–6, 7–6(2), [10–2].

References

Italian Tennis Federation official website
ITF search 

Roma Open
Roma Open